The 1970 New York gubernatorial election was held on November 3, 1970 to elect the Governor and Lieutenant Governor of New York. Incumbent Republican Governor Nelson Rockefeller defeated the Democratic nominee, former UN Ambassador and Supreme Court Justice Arthur Goldberg by more than ten percentage points. On January 1, 1971, he was sworn in for his fourth term as governor. Rockefeller received over 3.15 million votes in total, the highest total in any New York gubernatorial election until Andrew Cuomo received 3.64 million in 2018.

Goldberg's running mate, Basil Paterson, was the first African American nominee for Lieutenant Governor of New York. His son David Paterson would become the first African American Lieutenant Governor of New York. Paterson would serve as Governor of New York from 2008–2010 after the resignation of Eliot Spitzer.

Contested Nominations

Conservative

Liberal

Democratic

Results

See also
1970 New York state election
2006 New York gubernatorial election

Bibliography
Paterson, David "Black, Blind, & In Charge: A Story of Visionary Leadership and Overcoming Adversity."

References

1970
Gubernatorial
New York
November 1970 events in the United States
Nelson A. Rockefeller